Marc Coucke (born 27 January 1965) is a Belgian businessman, multimillionaire and media figure. Founder of former BEL20 pharmaceutical company Omega Pharma, he has spread his business interests across several sectors including art, through his company Kamacoucka, and sports, through the co-ownership and sponsorship of the UCI ProTeam  cycling team, sponsorship of French Ligue 1 side Lille OSC and as major share holder of Belgian Pro League team Anderlecht.

Education

Marc Coucke studied at St Barbara College in Ghent before attending the University of Ghent (Ghent, Belgium) where he studied pharmacy. Later he obtained a Master in General Management from the Vlerick Leuven Gent Management School.

Biography

In 1987, he co-founded Omega Pharma with Yvan Vindevogel. This Belgian pharmaceuticals company grew rapidly and in 2006 employed three thousand people whilst operating in thirty countries. He remained Chief Executive Officer of Omega Pharma until 30 September 2006, returning to the post in March 2008. Whilst his business profile represents considerable achievement there have been highly publicised failures that include the launch of Omega Pharma's E-Waves phone Chip in 2008. It was withdrawn shortly after release as it did not work. In August 2021 investment fund Waterland, one of the businesses of Coucke, was convicted to pay €266 million to pharmaceuticals company Perrigo in a dispute over the takeover of Omega Pharma.

After selling Omega Pharma Coucke has become a major investor in mostly Belgian businesses with his investment company Alychlo across several sectors like real estate, construction, pharma, technology, food industry and entertainment. Most eye-catching was becoming the major shareholder and chairman of Belgian football club RSC Anderlecht in January 2018 while he already did this before with KV Oostende in 2013.

In 2007, he was featured as a member of the jury in the television show De bedenkers.

Personal

Marc Coucke is married and has two daughters. He lives in the newly renovated eighteenth century Castle Mijl Eke near Merelbeke in east Flanders.

References

External links

 Official Twitter Account
Alychlo investment company

Flemish businesspeople
Ghent University alumni
1965 births
Living people
Belgian chief executives
20th-century Belgian businesspeople
21st-century Belgian businesspeople
Vlerick Business School alumni
Belgian billionaires